Scopula leucopis is a moth of the family Geometridae. It was described by Prout in 1926. It is found on Borneo.

Adults are large and whitish species. The wings are fasciated with fawn and lightly flecked with black scales.

References

Moths described in 1926
leucopis
Moths of Asia